Russell Dempster Carver (born 1934), is a male former rower who competed for England.

Rowing career
He represented England and won a bronze medal in the single sculls at the 1958 British Empire and Commonwealth Games in Cardiff, Wales.

He rowed for Trinity College, Cambridge and Eton College Boat Club and rowed against Oxford in the 1958 boat race.

Personal life
His father Humphrey Roberton Carver also rowed for Cambridge in the 1922 and 1925 races respectively. Russell was born in late 1934 in Kenya, because his father was a civil servant working there at the time. The family moved back to England in 1935 to live at Bolden Bridge House, Lymington, Hampshire.

References

1934 births
English male rowers
Commonwealth Games medallists in rowing
Commonwealth Games bronze medallists for England
Rowers at the 1958 British Empire and Commonwealth Games
Living people
Medallists at the 1958 British Empire and Commonwealth Games